Arthur Cocks may refer to:

Arthur Cocks (cricketer) (1904–1944), English cricketer and the first British Army officer killed on D-Day
Arthur Cocks (politician) (1862–1943), Australian politician
Arthur Cocks, 6th Baron Somers, Worcestershire cricketer
Arthur Cocks, 7th Baron Somers, see Royal Warrant of Precedence

See also
Arthur Somers-Cocks (1870–1923), English-born West Indian cricketer
Arthur Cox (disambiguation)
Arthur Coxe, bishop